Bert is Evil is the name of a parody website, founded by Dino Ignacio on March 30, 1997, which featured Bert, a character on the American children's television program Sesame Street. In 1998, Dino Ignacio, Wout J Reinders and Jasper Hulshoff Pol accepted the Webby Award and the People's Voice Award for Best Weird Website at the Palace of Fine Arts auditorium in San Francisco.

The website featured manipulated images of the character consorting with notoriously nefarious figures, such as Adolf Hitler, Saddam Hussein, Kim Jong-il, Robert Mugabe, and Osama bin Laden, as well as being present at events, such as the JFK assassination, and Oklahoma City bombing, humorously offered as "proof" that Bert was no mere innocent children's television character. The "Evil Bert" phenomenon was picked up by other humorists, who created their own images, linking Bert to current and historical atrocities.

In the summer of 1998, due to the website's immense cult popularity, it became too expensive for Ignacio to continue running. Instead of shutting the site down, he offered to allow anyone who was willing to mirror his original website the opportunity to host it. As a result, dozens of mirrors appeared, increasing the website's popularity and visibility.

Osama Bin Laden image

The first mirror, maintained by Dennis Pozniak, continued in the same vein by adding new "evidence" of Bert's evilness (such as Bert's connection to the Ramsey Family and serial killer Jack the Ripper). At the end of 1998, Pozniak posted a contribution, submitted by humorist J Roen, digitally manipulated to depict the then relatively unknown international terrorist, Osama bin Laden, posing with Bert.

In October 2001, an undoctored Reuters news photograph was published showing a pro Osama bin Laden protest rally in Bangladesh. One protester is seen holding a large collage style poster of bin Laden with a small image of Bert over his right shoulderthe same image posted to the Bert mirror in 1998which prompted much confusion and joking among Western audiences. Being unaware of Sesame Street, Dhaka printer Mostafa Kamal had copied the collage from the World Wide Web, leaving the image of Bert in his collage.

After this photo was released on the news wires, the owners of Sesame Street, Sesame Workshop, raised the possibility of pursuing legal action against Ignacio. In response, he took down the "Bert is Evil" section of his website due to Sesame Workshop's DMCA takedown notice, also stating that he did not want to undermine the character in the eyes of children who watched Sesame Street. "I am doing this because I feel this has gotten too close to reality", he said.

Since the original Bert/Osama picture had been posted to Dennis Pozniak's mirror, he too was bombarded by the international media seeking interviews. As a result of all the attention, Pozniak also closed his mirror.

See also

Internet humor
Photo manipulation
Internet phenomena

References

Further reading

BBC article with pictures
Snopes article about bin Laden and Bert appearance
CNN article
San Francisco Chronicle article

ABC News: The Wolf Files article at Archive.org
National Post article at Archive.is

External links
Bert is Evil Twitter account
Bert Is Evil! at Know Your Meme
Internet Superstar interview with Martin Sargent – from Revision3 August 2008
The Muppets Take Bangladesh – from Old Wide Web Podcast March 2011
Bert Is Evil: The True Story Behind the Web’s First Viral Hit
Bertsama bin Laden humor
The Original Bert is Evil at Archive.org

American comedy websites
Internet properties established in 1997
Internet properties disestablished in 2001
Internet memes
Defunct websites
Muppet parodies
Webby Award winners